RAD1 can refer to:

 Nintendo Research & Development 1
 RAD1 homolog, a human gene